Anna Mikhailovna Kotikova (born 13 October 1999) is a Russian volleyball player, who plays as an outside hitter for the Russian club  Dinamo Kazan and the  Russian women's national volleyball team. She has won gold medal at the 2016 Women's U19 Volleyball European Championship and silver medal at the 2017 FIVB Volleyball Women's U20 World Championship with the youth teams of Russia while being selected as the “most valuable player” at the former. In both tournaments, she played in the opposite position and was named the “best opposite spiker” of the tournament.  She has won the Russian Cup with her club in 2017.

Awards

Individuals
  2016 Women's U19 Volleyball European Championship "Most Valuable Player"
  2016 Women's U19 Volleyball European Championship "Best Opposite Spiker"
  
2017 FIVB Volleyball Women's U20 World Championship "Best Opposite Spiker"

Clubs
 2016–17 Russian Women's Volleyball Super League -  Runner-Up, with Dinamo Kazan
 2017 Russian Cup -  Champion, with Dinamo Kazan
 2017–18 Russian Women's Volleyball Super League -  Runner-Up, with Dinamo Kazan
 2018 Russian Cup -  Bronze Medal, with Dinamo Kazan
 2019 Russian Cup -  Champion, with Dinamo Kazan
 2019–20 Russian Super League -  Champion, with Dinamo Kazan

National team

Junior team
 2016 Women's U19 Volleyball European Championship -  Gold Medal
 2017 FIVB Volleyball Women's U20 World Championship -  Silver Medal
 2017 Summer Universiade -  Gold Medal

References

1999 births
Living people
Russian women's volleyball players
Universiade medalists in volleyball
Universiade gold medalists for Russia
Medalists at the 2017 Summer Universiade
20th-century Russian women
21st-century Russian women